Lavdim Zumberi (born 27 November 1999) is a Swiss-Kosovar footballer who plays for FC Wil.

Club career

FC Zürich
Zumberi started his footballing career with FC Bazenheid and later FC Wil, before moving to the academy of FC Zürich in 2015. His competitive debut for the first team was on 17 February 2019 in an away game against the BSC Young Boys. Zumberi signed his first professional contract on 22 May 2019 keeping him in Zürich until June 2022 and was permanently promoted to the first team squad. In September 2020 he moved to FC Wil where he signed a 2-year-contract.

References

External links

1999 births
Living people
Swiss men's footballers
Switzerland youth international footballers
Swiss people of Kosovan descent
Swiss people of Albanian descent
FC Zürich players
FC Wil players
Association football forwards
Swiss Super League players
Swiss Challenge League players